Karl Hermann Joseph Hubert Hilgers (17 January 1844 – 25 February 1925) was a German sculptor.

Life 
During a study trip he lived in Rome from 1873 to 1876. 1876–1895 he worked in Berlin, where he also received the title professor. 1895–1898 he was again active in Rome with a stay in the Villa Strohl-Fern, 1898–1902 in Florence and from 1902 again in Berlin. In the period 1896/1897 he was chairman of the Deutsche Künstlerverein zu Rome. Hilgers created numerous public monuments and competition designs, with which he was frequently represented at exhibitions from 1880 to 1916 (for example in Berlin, Munich and Düsseldorf) and also received prizes. In 1907, he was awarded a small gold medal at the Große Berliner Kunstausstellung.

Hilgers was married to Maria, née Andreae.

Work 

 1879: Genius der Kunst, on the façade of the former Kunsthalle in Düsseldorf (lost)
 1883: Colossal statue of Frederick William I of Prussia in the Hall of Fame at Berlin Zeughaus
 1888: Lessing-Denkmal in Berlin. According to Meyer's Großes Konversations-Lexikon, Hilgers won first prize in the competition in 1887; the sculptor was Otto Lessing.
 1890: Kriegerdenkmal in Düsseldorf Court Garden
 1894: Equestrian monument of William I, German Emperor in Stettin
 1897: Marble figure Muse (Nationalgalerie Berlin)
 1907: Marble statue Judith
 1912: Minerva fountain in front of the Alte Bibliothek in Berlin
 Marble group Eva an Abels Leiche
 Bronze statue Rudolf I of Germany, in Hamburg City Hall on the market side between the window niches
 four virtues as allegorical limestone figures for the Reichstag building in Berlin
 Two bronze reliefs for the Dirksen grave monument at Matthäikirchhof in Berlin

References

Further reading 
 Das geistige Deutschland am Ende des 19. Jahrhunderts. Enzyklopädie des deutschen Geisteslebens in biographischen Skizzen. Vol. 1: Die bildenden Künstler. C. G. Röder, Leipzig / Berlin 1898.
 Franz Neubert: Hilgers, Karl. In Deutsches Zeitgenossen-Lexikon. Biographisches Handbuch deutscher Männer und Frauen der Gegenwart. Schulze, Leipzig 1905, Sp. 606.
 Friedrich Jansa: Deutsche bildende Künstler in Wort und Bild. Jansa, Leipzig 1912, .
 Willy Oskar Dressler (ed.): . 8th edition, Vol. 2, Berlin 1921, .
 
 Heinz Kullnick: Hilgers, Karl. In Berliner und Wahlberliner. Personen und Persönlichkeiten in Berlin 1640–1914. Hayn, Berlin 1960, Sp. 429.

19th-century German sculptors
20th-century German sculptors
1844 births
1925 deaths
Artists from Düsseldorf